Cynthia Loewen (born November 13, 1993) is a Canadian beauty pageant titleholder who was crowned Miss Earth Canada in Montreal, Canada on August 23, 2014. She represented Canada in the Miss Earth 2014 pageant.

Personal life
Loewen's sibling, Garrick Loewen, is a professional triathlete.

Pageantry
Cynthia represented Canada in the Miss Teen Face of Beauty International pageant in 2012 in Chiang Mai, Thailand. She placed second runner-up and currently holds the record for highest Canadian placement in this competition.

Cynthia joined the Miss Earth  Canada pageant for the first time in 2012, where she placed first runner-up. The crown was won by Valérie Rémillard.

Cynthia joined the Miss Earth Canada pageant once again in 2014, where she then won the title. Under the training of Miss Earth Canada 2001, Michelle Weswaldi, she represented Canada as a finalist in the Miss Earth 2014 competition.

References

1993 births
Living people
Miss Earth 2014 contestants
People from Essex County, Ontario
Canadian beauty pageant winners
Female models from Ontario